John Mary Honi Uzuegbunam (born 9 March 1993) is a professional footballer who plays as a forward for TFF First League club Çaykur Rizespor. Born in Nigeria, he represented the Cameroon national team internationally.

Club career
Born in the Anambra State in Nigeria, Mary moved to Cameroon to join AS Fortuna de Mfou Yaoundé's youth team. On 28 March 2012, he was signed by Buriram United in what will be the beginning of three seasons spent in Thai football. His time with Buriram only lasted for a few months before he moved to fourth tier side Bangkok Christian College on 1 August 2012. A move to second tier club Krabi for the 2013 Thai Division 1 League would follow before ending his time in Thailand with fourth tier club Prachuap.

His advisor Ognjen Karisik would bring him to Europe where he had a trial with Serbian club Vojvodina who signed him on 24 January 2015 on a two-and-a-half year contract. He made his debut in a Serbian Cup game against Kolubara on 28 October 2015 that ended in a goalless draw, before Vojvodina won 5–4 on penalties. He would see very little playing time with the club after suffering from an anterior cruciate ligament injury. His contract with Vojvodina was eventually terminated, and on 18 July 2016 he signed a one-year deal with Slovenian side Rudar Velenje.

In January 2018, Mary moved to the China League One side Meizhou Hakka. He made his debut and scored his first goal for the club in a league game against Shijiazhuang Ever Bright on 10 March 2018 that ended in a 2–1 defeat. After winning the golden boot award at the end of the 2018 China League One campaign, Chinese top tier club Shenzhen signed him on 2 July 2019 halfway through the 2019 Chinese Super League season.

On 30 January 2022, Mary joined Saudi Arabian club Al-Shabab.

International career
Despite being born in Nigeria, Mary was naturalized and played for Cameroon U20 in 2011.

In 2021, he was called to the Cameroon senior team. He made his debut on 6 September 2021 in a World Cup qualifier against the Ivory Coast, a 2–1 away loss. He substituted Moumi Ngamaleu in the 62nd minute.

Career statistics

Honours
Individual
Slovenian PrvaLiga top scorer: 2016–17
China League One top scorer: 2018

References

External links

1993 births
Living people
Sportspeople from Anambra State
Cameroonian footballers
Cameroon under-20 international footballers
Cameroon international footballers
Nigerian footballers
Nigerian emigrants to Cameroon
Cameroonian expatriate footballers
Nigerian expatriate footballers
Association football forwards
John Mary
John Mary
FK Vojvodina players
NK Rudar Velenje players
Meizhou Hakka F.C. players
Shenzhen F.C. players
Avispa Fukuoka players
Al-Shabab FC (Riyadh) players
Çaykur Rizespor footballers
Serbian SuperLiga players
Slovenian PrvaLiga players
China League One players
Chinese Super League players
J1 League players
Saudi Professional League players
TFF First League players
Nigerian expatriate sportspeople in Thailand
Cameroonian expatriate sportspeople in Thailand
Expatriate footballers in Thailand
Cameroonian expatriate sportspeople in Serbia
Expatriate footballers in Serbia
Cameroonian expatriate sportspeople in Slovenia
Expatriate footballers in Slovenia
Cameroonian expatriate sportspeople in China
Expatriate footballers in China
Cameroonian expatriate sportspeople in Japan
Expatriate footballers in Japan
Cameroonian expatriate sportspeople in Saudi Arabia
Expatriate footballers in Saudi Arabia
Cameroonian expatriate sportspeople in Turkey
Expatriate footballers in Turkey